

The Order of Symbolic Propitiousness Ramkeerati  (Special Class) - Boy Scout Citation Medal is established on 26 November 1987 (B.E. 2530) by King Rama IX of Thailand to be bestowed onto those who have rendered constant service and support to Boy Scout activities for at least five consecutive years. Recipients must have received the Boy Scout Citation Medal of Vajira (First Class).  Members of the order have no post-nominal entitlement.

Insignia
The decoration consists of a single class, and is worn on the neck.  The pendant of the Order is oval shaped, 2.5 cm wide, and 3.5 cm tall. The obverse has a silver face of a tiger and trident on a blue enamel background, surrounded by a gold and silver ray design. The pendant hangs from the ribbon via a gold Thai crown. The reverse is gold, with a crown over the logo of the World Scout movement.

References

Ramkeerati, Order Of
Scouting and Guiding in Thailand
Ramkeerati, Order Of
1987 establishments in Thailand